ISO/IEC 33001 Information technology -- Process assessment -- Concepts and terminology is a set of technical standards documents for the computer software development process and related business management functions.

ISO/IEC 33001:2015 is a revision of ISO/IEC 15504, also termed Software Process Improvement and Capability Determination (SPICE).

The ISO/IEC 330xx family superseded the ISO/IEC 155xx family.

Further reading 
 ISO/IEC 33001:2015 Information technology -- Process assessment -- Concepts and terminology
 ISO/IEC 33002:2015 Information technology -- Process assessment -- Requirements for performing process assessment
 ISO/IEC 33003:2015 Information technology -- Process assessment -- Requirements for process measurement frameworks
 ISO/IEC 33004:2015 Information technology -- Process assessment -- Requirements for process reference, process assessment and maturity models
 ISO/IEC 33014:2013 Information technology -- Process assessment -- Guide for process improvement
 ISO/IEC 33020:2015 Information technology -- Process assessment -- Process measurement framework for assessment of process capability
 ISO/IEC 33063:2015 Information technology -- Process assessment -- Process assessment model for software testing
 ISO/IEC TR 29110-3-1:2015 Systems and software engineering -- Lifecycle profiles for Very Small Entities (VSEs) -- Part 3-1: Assessment guide

References 

Software engineering standards
Software development process
33001